Nightlight is a collaborative extended play by Australian singer-songwriter Megan Washington and Sean Foran. It was released in 2006. 

At the 2008 Australian Jazz Bell Awards, it won Best Australian Jazz Vocal Album.

Following an appearance on Spicks & Specks, the EP debuted and peaked at number 53 on the ARIA Charts in October 2009.

Track listing

Personnel 
 Megan Washington – vocals
 Sean Foran – piano, electric piano
 Benjamin Portas – artwork
 Sam Vincent – double bass 
 John Parker – drums 
 Chris Pickering – guitar
 John Parker – mixer

Charts

References 

2006 albums
2006 EPs
Jazz albums by Australian artists
EPs by Australian artists
Megan Washington albums